Michelle-Lee Raquel Ahye (last name rhyming with Lee, thus, ah-ee) (born 10 April 1992) is a Trinidadian sprinter. She was the gold medallist at the 2018 Commonwealth Games

She was part of Trinidad and Tobago's squad that finished fourth in the women's 4 × 100 m relay at the 2011 World Championships in Athletics, while running a national record time of 42.50 seconds in the heats.

She was born in Port of Spain but lives in the community of Carenage with her mother, Raquel Ahye. She attended Carenage Girls' Government Primary School where her talent of running was discovered, with the help of her Physical Education teacher, Ms. Akowe. She then furthered her career by running in the Milo Games where she proved herself to be one of the best runners in her age group.

Ahye won the Trinidad & Tobago National T&F Championships 100m title in both 2013 and 2014. In 2013, Ahye traveled to Moscow, Russia to compete at the IAAF World Outdoor T&F Championships, representing her country of Trinidad & Tobago. In the winter of 2014, Ahye traveled to Sopot, Poland representing Trinidad & Tobago at the IAAF World Indoor T&F Championships in the women's 60m dash. In the finals, Ahye set a new National Record for 60 meters by running 7.10 seconds and placing 6th overall.

In the 2014 outdoor season, Ahye burst onto the worldwide professional Track and Field scene by running at personal best 10.85 in the 100m, winning 12 of 13 races and ranking third in the world by Track and Field News.  Ahye placed 1st in the 100m event at the Lausanne Diamond League meet on July 3, 2014 running 10.98. Michelle then traveled to the Glasgow Diamond League meet in Scotland, and defeated the defending 100m Olympic Champion Shelly-Ann Fraser Pryce of Jamaica by running 11.01 on July 12, 2014. Ahye was also victorious in several other world-class T&F meets in Guadeloupe, Ponce Puerto Rico, Paris France and Switzerland.  On Sept 13, 2014 Ahye placed 2nd at the Continental Cup in Marrakech Morocco for the Americas Team.

Ahye won the first ever gold medal for a female Trinidadian track and field athlete at the 2018 Commonwealth Games in Gold Coast, Australia

Ahye is coached by Fritzroy "Eric" Francis in Houston, Texas and managed by Stellar Athletics.

Ahye missed the 2020 Summer Olympics after receiving a two year ban for drug-testing "whereabouts failures".

She is openly lesbian.

International competitions

References

External links

1992 births
Athletes (track and field) at the 2012 Summer Olympics
Athletes (track and field) at the 2016 Summer Olympics
Athletes (track and field) at the 2014 Commonwealth Games
Athletes (track and field) at the 2018 Commonwealth Games
Living people
Olympic athletes of Trinidad and Tobago
Sportspeople from Port of Spain
Trinidad and Tobago female sprinters
World Athletics Championships athletes for Trinidad and Tobago
World Athletics Championships medalists
Commonwealth Games medallists in athletics
Commonwealth Games gold medallists for Trinidad and Tobago
Athletes (track and field) at the 2019 Pan American Games
Pan American Games silver medalists for Trinidad and Tobago
Pan American Games medalists in athletics (track and field)
IAAF Continental Cup winners
Commonwealth Games gold medallists in athletics
Medalists at the 2019 Pan American Games
Lesbian sportswomen
Trinidad and Tobago LGBT sportspeople
LGBT track and field athletes
Athletes (track and field) at the 2020 Summer Olympics
Olympic female sprinters
Athletes (track and field) at the 2022 Commonwealth Games
Medallists at the 2018 Commonwealth Games